CenturyTel of Adamsville, Inc. is a telephone operating company of CenturyLink providing local telephone services to communities in Tennessee, including Adamsville and Yellow Creek. The company was founded in 1951.

The company was named Century Telephone of Adamsville, Inc. from 1994 to 1998.

The company is owned by CenturyLink, which used to be called CenturyTel.

References

Lumen Technologies
Communications in Mississippi
Communications in Tennessee
Telecommunications companies established in 1951
Telecommunications companies of the United States
American companies established in 1951
1951 establishments in Tennessee